The Muksu (Muqsu) is a west-flowing river in northeastern Tajikistan. It is a tributary of the Vakhsh which in turn is a tributary of the Amu Darya. It is formed at the confluence of the rivers Seldara (draining the Fedchenko Glacier) and Sauksay (draining the Saukdara Glaciers), near Altyn Mazar. The north side of its valley is the Trans-Alay Range and the south side is formed by the Peter I Range and the Academy of Sciences Range. It joins the Kyzyl-Suu (which drains the Alay Valley) to form the Surkhob or Vakhsh. At Altyn Mazar there is a pass leading north to Daroot-Korgon in the Alay Valley.

References

Rivers of Tajikistan